Jintara Poonlarp (b. 6 March 1969, Kaset Wisai district, Roi Et province, Thailand) is a Thai mor lam, luk thung and pop music singer.

She is one of the most popular and prolific of the artists in the mor lam (Thai country) and luk thung (Thai pop-country) genres, having released 50 original albums and 47 singles as well as many compilations. She records roughly equal amounts of mor lam and luk thung, but two of her best-known songs are the string (Thai pop) hits "Ma Tammai" and "Faen Ja," recorded with Thongchai McIntyre.

She is also sometimes known by her nickname Jin or the epithet sao siang pin (Thai: สาวเสียงพิณ, meaning "lute-voiced girl"), and she has a unique identity which is short hair with bangs. She has performed on stage for 33 years.

Early life and childhood
Born in Thailand's Isan region, Jintara's birth name was Tongbai Janlueang but this changed to Tongbai Poonlarp when her parents registered their marriage. Jintara is her stage name. Although Saturday March 13-year 1971 is commonly given as her birth date she celebrates her birthday on March 6, and this is the date of birth on her ID card. On her Facebook page the year she was born is given as 1969. Her mother could not remember the exact date she was born, not uncommon in rural Thailand in previous decades.

Music career
She began performing in her early teens. She made 20 audio-only recordings for GMM Grammy and later a further five for the Master Tape record label. She has since made a further series of recordings for Master Tape, variously entitled Luk tung sa on and Mor lam sa on, each on VCD, CD and audio tape formats ("sa on" in the Isan language meaning roughly "enjoyable").

A number of greatest hits collections have also been issued, some of which contain videos of songs from the first audio-only series. Her first five albums included only luk thung, but since then most have combined luk thung, mor lam and sometimes string (Thai pop). Her most famous string songs are "Mah Tummai" [Thai: มาทำไม] and "Faen Ja," both in collaboration with Thongchai McIntyre. She tours with a live show from September to May each year and has made several appearances in Europe and North America.

Among her best-known songs is "Sǎo Isǎan plát tìn" [Thai: สาวอีสานพลัดถิ่น] ("Isan girl separated from her home," album 9), which incorporates the typical Thai country themes of poverty, homesickness and an unfaithful lover. "Arlai World Trade" ("Mourning the World Trade Center," album Luk tung sa on 6) aroused comment in Thailand's English-language press for the way it addressed the September 11, 2001 attacks: "the reigning Morlam superstar of Thailand laments the attacks of September 11 while young, bare-midriffed Thai girls gyrate in front of a surging American flag".

In 2003, the Thai Ministry of Culture proposed banning one of her songs, "Tears of a Lieutenant's Wife" ("Namta mia nairoi") on state-run media.

By February 2006, she had released 38 original albums plus numerous compilations.

In 2007, she was singer of R-Siam and she was expired in 2017. She is singer of Cat 9 studio since 2018. She returned to popularlity by song title Tao Ngoi, and hit No. 1 on Thai music charts in 2018 - 2019, earning 123M YouTube views as of September 2019.

Acting career
In 2001, Jintara played her first television role in the series Nai Hoy Tamin, about the life of rural people in Isan in historical times.  She co-starred in the 2006 action film, Chai Lai (Dangerous Flowers), portraying a member of a top-secret team of female crimefighters.

Personal life
In 2004, she began studying for a degree in Faculty of Humanities and Social Sciences at Suan Sunandha Rajabhat University, Bangkok, from which she was due to graduate in 2006.  Newspaper reports suggested that she was considering standing as an MP for the Chart Thai (Thai Nation) party, but would not be able to do so until she had graduated; she did not stand in the 2005 election. She was awarded an honorary degree by Roi Et Rajabhat University in October 2004.

Discography

Original albums

Compilations and live albums

Filmography

TV Drama

Film

References

External links

Official site 
   
 

1969 births
Living people
Jintara Poonlarp
Jintara Poonlarp
Jintara Poonlarp
Jintara Poonlarp
Jintara Poonlarp
Jintara Poonlarp
Jintara Poonlarp
Jintara Poonlarp
Jintara Poonlarp
Jintara Poonlarp
Jintara Poonlarp